The Oxfordshire Election of 1754, part of the British general election of that year and involving the selection of two Members of Parliament (MPs) to represent the Oxfordshire constituency, was probably the most notorious English county election of the 18th century. It was depicted in Hogarth's famous series of paintings and engravings, The Humours of an Election.

Background
Oxfordshire was a county constituency electing two MPs. The right to vote was held by all the Forty Shilling Freeholders of the county, amounting to about 4,000 in 1754, but because of the expense of a contested election the competing interests tried to reach a compromise without resorting to a poll if at all possible, and in 1754 Oxfordshire had not seen a contested election for 44 years. The expenses entailed not only the cost of campaigning across the county, but the need for the candidates to meet the expenses of their voters in travelling to Oxford (where the poll was held in the grounds of Exeter College) and in lavishly entertaining them while they were there; but outright bribery was also rife.

Campaign

The candidates in 1754 were two Tories, Sir James Dashwood (who was standing for re-election) and The Viscount Wenman; and two Whigs, Viscount Parker (heir to the Earl of Macclesfield) and Sir Edward Turner. The other major local grandees, the Duke of Marlborough and Earl Harcourt, joined Macclesfield in backing the two Whigs, while the Earl of Abingdon and Earl of Lichfield supported the two Tories.

Both sides spent extravagantly: Prime Minister Henry Pelham promised £7,000 of government funds towards the Whigs' expenses, while the Tories spent £20,000 (of which £8,000 was raised by public subscription).

Many commemorative objects were produced. A pot inscribed "Wenman & Dashwood Forever. 1755" is in the Victoria and Albert Museum, and one inscribed "I say Wenman & Dashwood, friend. What say you?" is in the Ashmolean Museum. A glass inscribed "Hark Wenman & Dashwood Sr Watn & the old Interest forever." is in the Museum of London.

Edward Gibbon referred to the election in his Memoirs of My Life and Writings, saying:
"A general election was now approaching: the great Oxfordshire contest already blazed with all the malevolence of party-zeal.  Magdalen College was devoutly attached to the old interest! and the names of Wenman and Dashwood were more frequently pronounced, than those of Cicero and Chrysostom."

The Calendar (New Style) Act 1750 was one of the Tory issues in the election. Thomas Parker was the son of George Parker, 2nd Earl of Macclesfield, the astronomer who had chaired the committee stage of the bill in the House of Commons of Great Britain. Amongst the lampoons resulting was:His [Parker's] fine moving Speeches are nothing but Froth; 
Our Time he has alter'd and turn'd it about, 
So he like Old Christmas shall too be turned out. 
Tho' Lords and great Placemen do with him combine, 
'Twill signify nothing when honest Men join; 
Drink Wenman and Dashwood, and stand to the Tack, 
We want no old Turner nor new Almanack.

Result

The result was declared on 17 April 1754. Wenman and Dashwood were ahead in the count of votes, but the returning officer made a "double return" (declaring both pairs of candidates to be elected, leaving the House of Commons to make the decision), and both sides petitioned against the election of their opponents.

The Commons took months to reach its decision, examining the legitimacy of many of the individual votes; but since MPs almost invariably voted in such cases on partisan lines rather than on the merits of the case, the result was a foregone conclusion - the Commons had a Whig majority, and therefore the two Whig candidates were declared elected on 23 April 1755. As one of the Tories on the Committee, Sir William Meredith noted in a letter to the Duke of Portland:
Nor, to this hour, can either side tell which had the majority of legal votes, nor any Member of Parliament who voted in that question give any other reason for his vote but as he stood inclined for the old [Tory] or new [Whig] interest of Oxfordshire.

Both parties in Oxfordshire were united in their determination to avoid a repetition of such a contest, and managed to reach an amicable compromise before the next general election, the Duke of Marlborough in future to nominate one member and the local Tories the other. Oxfordshire did not see a contested election again until 1826.

References

Sources

Further reading
 
 
 

1754 in England
1754 in politics
Elections to the Parliament of Great Britain
History of Oxfordshire
Politics of Oxfordshire
18th century in Oxfordshire